Hollington may refer to:
Hollington, East Sussex, England
Hollington, Derbyshire, England
Hollington, Hampshire, England
Hollington, Staffordshire, England